Ruff N' Ready is the third album by American R&B group Ready for the World. It was released September 19, 1988 on MCA Records.

Track listing
"My Girly" 5:31
"Shame" 5:00
"Cowboy" 4:31
"Gently" 5:29
"Money" 5:22
"Darlin' Darlin" 4:36
"Don't You Wanna (With Me)" 4:29
"Late Saturday Night" 4:34 
"It's Funny" 4:41
"It's All up to You" 4:32
"My Girly (Extended Version)" 7:48

Charts

References

1988 albums
MCA Records albums
Ready for the World albums